James Alexander Brewer (25 February 1818 – 10 January 1886) was a naturalist, plant-collector, botanist, a writer of local floras, a beetle-collector, and a postmaster in the British Post Office. He was a member of the Botanical Society of London, a member of the Linnean Society of London, and the first honorary secretary of the 'Holmesdale Natural History Club' in Reigate, in the Vale of Homesdale.

In 1856 he published a New flora of the neighborhood of Reigate, Surrey, and in 1861 he was asked by the 'Holmesdale Natural History Club' to edit for publication the manuscript of John Drew Salmons on the Flora of Surrey.

Brewer was elected a Fellow of the Linnean Society of London in 1856.

He collected plants and insects in Great Britain and Australia.

Brewer died on 10 January 1886 in Tonbridge, Kent.

Bibliography

References

1818 births
1886 deaths
19th-century British botanists